Anders Jæger-Amland (né Jæger-Synnevaag; born 29 July 1989) is a rallying co-driver from Norway. He has been the co-driver of Andreas Mikkelsen since 2016.

Career

In , he competed in WRC-3 and JWRC, with Ole Christian Veiby. In , Jæger-Amland became Mikkelsen's new co-driver at Volkswagen and they won two rallies in their first season together, finishing third in the championship.

They moved to Škoda Motorsport in the WRC-2 for their  campaign, as Volkswagen works team departed the WRC in 2017. Mikkelsen and Jæger-Amland joined Citroën for the 2017 Rally d'Italia replacing Stéphane Lefebvre and Gabin Moreau. They would also make appearances for the French team in Poland and Germany. Jæger-Amland joined Hyundai Motorsport with Mikkelsen in 2017, signing a deal which would keep them at the team until the end of 2019.

WRC victories

Career results

Complete WRC results

References

External links

Complete results at eWRC
Profile at WRC.com 

1989 births
Norwegian rally co-drivers
Living people
Sportspeople from Oslo
World Rally Championship co-drivers